U.S. Route 287 (US 287) is a north-south United States Numbered Highway in the state of Montana.

Route description 

US 287 in Montana begins at the West Entrance to Yellowstone National Park concurrent with US 20 and US 287, at the edge of the town of West Yellowstone. Some commercially produced maps show US 287 going through Yellowstone National Park; however, it officially has a gap inside the park and resumes in Wyoming at the South Entrance, concurrent with US 89 and US 191. A few blocks into West Yellowstone, US 20 leaves the US 191 / US 287 concurrency and heads west towards the Targhee Pass and Idaho.

On the east side of Helena, the combined route intersects I-15, where US 287 continues north on I-15 and US 12 heads west through downtown Helena.

US 287 is one of three highways in Montana numbered '287', the other two being Montana Highway 287 (MT 287) and Montana Secondary Highway 287 (S-287).

History

US 287 was originally designated as Montana State Highway 287 (MT 287). The Montana State Highway Commission first assigned the MT 287 designation in 1958 to a cross-state route from Yellowstone National Park at West Yellowstone to the Canada–United States border at the Piegan–Carway Border Crossing between Babb and Cardston, Alberta. The route joined US 10S—along the modern Interstate 90 (I-90) corridor—to its junction with US 10 and US 10N near Three Forks. MT 287 continued with US 10N north and west to Helena, then the route ran concurrently with US 91 (along the modern I-15 corridor) to Wolf Creek. MT 287 replaced MT 33 between Wolf Creek and Choteau, then the highway ran concurrently with US 89 through Browning to Canada. After the Hebgen Lake earthquake in 1959, which destroyed part of the highway along that lake and created Quake Lake, MT 287 was temporarily rerouted to the highway north from Raynolds Pass.

In 1961, MT 287 was rerouted and replaced MT 34 from Ennis to Twin Bridges, ran concurrently with MT 41 to north of Silver Star, and replaced S-401 north to US 10 at Whitehall. MT 287 continued east with US 10 to rejoin its previous route west of Three Forks. The portion of the highway between Ennis and the US 10 junction became MT 287A. 

In 1965, the US 287 designation was extended north from Denver, Colorado along its present alignment, replacing sections of MT 287 south of Ennis and north of Sappington, as well as all of MT 287A; the MT 287/US 89 concurrency north of Choteau was also dropped. The Montana Highway Commission requested the extension following lobbying from the U.S. Highway 287 Association and prior rejections from the AASHO, seeking a direct connection to either the Canadian border or Glacier National Park.

Major intersections

See also

References

External links

87-2
 Montana
Transportation in Gallatin County, Montana
Transportation in Madison County, Montana
Transportation in Jefferson County, Montana
Transportation in Broadwater County, Montana
Transportation in Lewis and Clark County, Montana
Transportation in Teton County, Montana